Stein Arne Føyen (born 11 February 1935) is a Norwegian former sailor who competed in the 1964 Summer Olympics and in the 1968 Summer Olympics.

References

1935 births
Living people
Norwegian male sailors (sport)
Olympic sailors of Norway
Sailors at the 1964 Summer Olympics – 5.5 Metre
Sailors at the 1968 Summer Olympics – 5.5 Metre